Two ships of the Royal Navy have been named HMS P32.

 , a P-class patrol boat launched in 1916 and sold in 1921.
 , a U-class submarine launched in December 1940 and sunk in August 1941.

References
 

Royal Navy ship names